Mokope Modjadji V (27 April 193728 June 2001) was the fifth Rain Queen of the Balobedu tribe in the Limpopo Province of South Africa from 1981 until her death in 2001.

Life

Mokope Modjadji was very traditional in her role as Rain Queen. She lived in seclusion in the Royal Compound in Khetlhakone Village and followed all the customs the Rain Queens were expected to follow.

Mokope Modjadji met and became good friends with the then President of South Africa Nelson Mandela in 1994. Mandela could speak to Mokope only through the traditional intermediary.

Later they became better friends and Mandela bought the Rain Queen a Japanese car to help her travel up the steep roads to her Royal Compound. He was then able to meet her in person and when asked about the Rain Queen Mandela said that, just like Queen Elizabeth II, Queen Modjadji did not answer questions.

On other political fronts, Queen Mokope did not support the idea of an ANC government as she believed that its anti-traditional ideas would dilute her authority. However once the ANC came to power, they treated the Rain Queen with respect. She was even offered an annual salary.

Mokope Modjadji had three children, including her designated successor, Princess Makheala. However, Princess Makheala died in 2001, two days before the death of her mother. Queen Mokope died at the age of 65. Makheala's daughter, Makobo, became the next Rain Queen. Mokope's son, Prince Masopha Edwin Modjadji, died in August 2005.

External links
Information on Rain Queen Customs
Death of Modjadji V from the New York Times
Obituary of Queen Modjadji V from The Independent (London)

1937 births
2001 deaths
Rain Queens
Female heirs apparent
20th-century women rulers